Georgios Gazis (born 25 May 1981) is a Greek amateur boxer. He competed at the 2008 Summer Olympics in the men's middleweight division.

Gazis lost his qualifier semi to Jean-Mickaël Raymond but won the decisive third place bout against Victor Cotiujanschi.

At the Olympics, he defeated Herry Saliku Biembe but lost to southpaw Carlos Góngora (1:12).

External links
2nd Qualifier
NBC data

Living people
Sportspeople from Kozani
Middleweight boxers
1981 births
Olympic boxers of Greece
Boxers at the 2004 Summer Olympics
Boxers at the 2008 Summer Olympics
Greek male boxers
Mediterranean Games bronze medalists for Greece
Competitors at the 2001 Mediterranean Games
Mediterranean Games medalists in boxing
21st-century Greek people